Siegfried Rauch (2 April 1932 – 11 March 2018) was a German film and television actor. In a career spanning over 60 years, he appeared in several international film productions  and had leading roles in numerous German television productions.

Career
Siegfried Rauch was born in Landsberg am Lech, Upper Bavaria. He studied drama at the Ludwig Maximilian University of Munich and also attended private drama lessons. He began performing in theatres in 1958, beginning with Bremen (until 1962), and followed by Berlin, Munich and Hamburg.

In the 1970s, Rauch appeared in the 1970 Hollywood film Patton as Captain Steiger. In Le Mans (1971), Rauch played the race driver Erich Stahler who is Steve McQueen's rival. In Samuel Fuller's The Big Red One, Rauch played a German army sergeant, the counterpart of Lee Marvin's character, who experiences the same events as Marvin only from a German perspective. Other Hollywood productions in which Rauch appeared were The Eagle Has Landed (1976) and Escape to Athena (1979).

His most famous leading role on 1970s German television was Thomas Lieven in Es muss nicht immer Kaviar sein (It Can't Always Be Caviar), based on the spy novel by Johannes Mario Simmel. His various other roles on television propelled his career as an actor in Germany.

From 1999 to 2013 Rauch had one of the leading roles as the captain on Das Traumschiff, one of the most-watched television series in Germany. In this role he was preceded by Heinz Weiss and succeeded by Sascha Hehn. He also appeared regularly in other German TV productions, including Der Bergdoktor, and remained active until his death.

Personal life
Siegfried Rauch, also known as "Sigi", lived in Obersöchering near Weilheim in southern Upper Bavaria. Rauch married Karin in 1964, and they had two sons together. Steve McQueen was the godfather of his son Jakob.

Rauch died on 11 March 2018 from sudden heart failure which caused him to fall down stairs at the village fire station near his home. He was 85 years old.

Selected filmography

The Vulture Wally (1956) .... Leander
The Hunter of Fall (1956) .... Toni, Wilderer
Kommissar X – Drei gelbe Katzen (1966) .... Nitro
Le Saint prend l'affût (1966) .... Johnny K.W. Mest (uncredited)
Spy Today, Die Tomorrow (1967) .... Tazzio
The Monk with the Whip (1967) .... Frank Keeney
Kommissar X – Drei blaue Panther (1968) .... Anthony
The Zombie Walks (1968) .... Dr. Brand
Peter und Sabine (1968) .... Dr. Petter, Klassenlehrer
Ein dreifach Hoch dem Sanitätsgefreiten Neumann (1968) .... Sanitätsgefreiter Neumann
Patton (1970) .... Capt. Oskar Steiger
 (1970) .... Chauffeur
Nous n'irons plus au bois (1970) .... Werner
 (1970) .... 1. Kommissar
Le Mans (1971) .... Erich Stahler
Pas folle la guêpe (1972)
Little Mother (1973) .... Colonel Pinares
The Hunter of Fall (1974) .... Huisen-Toni
Zwei himmlische Dickschädel (1974) .... Lenz
Stolen Heaven (1974) .... Jungpfarrer Franz Gruber
The Eagle Has Landed (1976) .... Sgt. Brandt
It Can't Always Be Caviar (TV miniseries, 1977) .... Thomas Lieven
The Standard (1977) .... Graf Bottenlauben
Waldrausch (1977) .... Krispin
The Uranium Conspiracy (1978) .... The Baron
Escape to Athena (1979) .... Lt. Braun
Flashpoint Africa (1980) .... Joe
The Big Red One (1980) .... Sgt. Schroeder
Mein Freund Winnetou (1980, TV miniseries) .... Old Shatterhand
Contamination (1980) .... Hamilton
 (1984) .... Hans van Wielligh
Popcorn und Paprika (1984) .... Sigi
Das Traumschiff (1986, 1997, 1999–2014, TV series) ... Kapitän Paulsen
Death Stone (1987) .... Hemingway
Fire, Ice and Dynamite (1990) .... Larry
Wildbach (1993–1997, TV series) ... Martin Kramer
Sons of Trinity (1995) .... Parker
Geregelte Verhältnisse (2001) .... Anton Fenzl
 (2005) .... Franz Flender
Kreuzfahrt ins Glück (2007–2013, TV series) ... Kapitän Paulsen
Der Bergdoktor (2008–2018, TV series) .... Dr. Roman Melchinger (final appearance)

References

External links

 

1932 births
2018 deaths
People from Landsberg am Lech
German male film actors
German male television actors
German male stage actors
20th-century German male actors
21st-century German male actors
Deaths from falls